Hung Fook Tong is a chain of herbal tea shops based in Hong Kong, specializing in Chinese Chinese herb teas, soups, healthy food and guilinggao. In 2015, Hung Fook Tong had a market share of 37.5% in Hong Kong's wellness drink market. The chain was founded in 1986 by Tse Po-tat, Kwan Wang-yung and Wong Pui-chu, and has been publicly traded on the Hong Kong Stock Exchange since 23 June 2014.

References

External links 
 Official website

Hong Kong brands
Food and drink companies of Hong Kong
Restaurant chains in Hong Kong